Mangrotha is a populated place in district Dera Ghazi Khan and in Tehsil Taunsa Sharif in Pakistan.

Populated places in Dera Ghazi Khan District
Union councils of Dera Ghazi Khan District
Cities and towns in Punjab, Pakistan